Brandon Robert Brown (born August 14, 1989) is an American professional basketball player for Hapoel Jerusalem of the Israeli Basketball Premier League. In his career, he has also played in France, Russia, Poland, Romania, Bulgaria, Brazil, Australia, Cyprus, and Greece.

Professional career
Brandon Brown won the 2018-19 Bulgarian Basketball Championship with Balkan Botevgrad.

Brown recalls that before he joined Cluj-Napoca, he had never played in front of 10,000 visitors before. During the 2021–22 Champions League season he led his team CS Universitatea Cluj-Napoca to the Quarterfinals. This placement exceeded expectations. Brown was one of the favorites to win the competition's MVP award. Other leading players on his side included Patrick Richard, Andrija Stipanović, Elijah Stewart or Dustin Hogue.

On July 2, 2022, Brown signed with Peristeri of the Greek Basket League and the Basketball Champions League. However, on September 11, 2022, he parted ways with the club due to a pressing family matter.

On November 21, 2022, he signed with Hapoel Jerusalem of the Israeli Basketball Premier League.

References

External links
Profile at Eurobasket.com

1989 births
Living people
American expatriate basketball people in Australia
American expatriate basketball people in Brazil
American expatriate basketball people in Bulgaria
American expatriate basketball people in Cyprus
American expatriate basketball people in France
American expatriate basketball people in Greece
American expatriate basketball people in Poland
American expatriate basketball people in Romania
American expatriate basketball people in Russia
American men's basketball players
Basketball players from Washington (state)
Peristeri B.C. players
Point guards
University of Montana Western alumni